Mathew Buckley (born 22 January 1973 in Sydney) is an Australian baseball player. He represented Australia at the 2000 Summer Olympics. Buckley also played in the 2000-01 International Baseball League of Australia season.

References

External links
 

1973 births
Living people
Australian baseball players
Olympic baseball players of Australia
Baseball players at the 2000 Summer Olympics
Baseball players from Sydney